Grammetal is a former Verwaltungsgemeinschaft in the district Weimarer Land in Thuringia, Germany. The seat of the Verwaltungsgemeinschaft was in Isseroda. It was disbanded in December 2019, when its members merged into the new municipality Grammetal.

The Verwaltungsgemeinschaft Grammetal consisted of the following municipalities:

 Bechstedtstraß 
 Daasdorf am Berge 
 Hopfgarten 
 Isseroda 
 Mönchenholzhausen 
 Niederzimmern 
 Nohra 
 Ottstedt am Berge 
 Troistedt

Former Verwaltungsgemeinschaften in Thuringia